Ingus Bankevics (born 18 April 1985) is a Latvian professional basketball player, who plays the small guard position for the English club Manchester Giants. He has previously played for Latvian national team.

Pro clubs
  BK Gulbenes Buki
  BK Valmiera
  BK VEF Rīga
  Stade Olympique Maritime Boulonnais
  Saint-Chamond Basket
  BC Pieno žvaigždės
  Manchester Giants

External links
FIBA Europe Profile

1985 births
Living people
Latvian men's basketball players
People from Auce